Cheyyur taluk is a taluk of Chengalpattu district of the Indian state of Tamil Nadu. The headquarters of the taluk is the town of Cheyyur.

Demographics
According to the 2011 census, the taluk of Cheyyur had a population of 1 with 102,128  males and 101,591 females. There were 900 women for every 1000 men. The taluk had a literacy rate of 66.68. Child population in the age group below 6 was 9,587 Males and 9,070 Females.

Administration
The taluk is administered by the Tahsildar office located in Cheyyur.

History
Cheyyur, near chennai is a quaint town situated 29 km from Madurantakam, at Chengalpattu in Kanchipuram District of Tamil Nadu. This tiny hamlet was earlier called Jayamkonda-Cholapuram, Seyyur and Belapuri. In the early days, this area was a dense forest and kept as a reserve for the Chola kings to hunt.

An ancient temple called Cheyyur Shiva Temple, 800 years old, constructed during the reign of the Chola kings, is the major attraction. Near the Shiva Temple is another shrine dedicated to Muruga as an infant. In Tamil 'Sei' denotes 'infant' and the name of the village (Seyyur, later Cheyyur) is derived from this fact.

Chennai International Airport and Chengalpattu Junction Railway Station serve this area. Visitors can access Cheyyur from Madurakantam, which can be reached by road either from Chennai or Chengalpattu. Private taxis and regular buses are available from Madurakantam to Cheyyur and 7 km from ECR(Ellai amman Kovil-Nainarkuppam), Cheyyur is located 65.7 km distance from its District Main City Kanchipuram Cheyyur Pin Code is 603302 .
The Government of India has proposed to develop a 4000 MW Ultra Mega Power Plant (UMPP) at Cheyyur .

Cheyyur Map

This taluk was earlier, a part of the Kanchipuram district until the district was bifurcated and a new Chengalpattu district was created.

List of places in Cheyyur Taluk
Village Name 
 Adayalacheri
 Agaram
 Akkinambattu
 Alambari
 Amanthankaranai
 Ammanambakkam
 Ammanur
 Anaikattu
Andarkuppam
 Arappedu
 Arasur
 Arkadu
 Atchivilagam
 Attupattukottapanjai
 Ayakkunnam
 Cheyyur
 Chinnavelikkadu
 Chittarkadu
 Chunampet
 Gangadevankuppam
 Gurumpirai
 Illeedu ( main place ) in chunampet
 Indalur
 Iraniyasitti
 Irumbali
 Isur
 Kadalur
 Kadapperi
 Kadugapattu
 Kadapakkam
 Kadukalur
 Kalkulam
 Kanattur
 Kannimangalam
 karukkamalai
 Karuppur
 Kayapakkam
 Kesavarajanpettai
 Kilacheri
 Kilarkollai
 Kilmaruvathur
 Kodapattanam
 Kodur
 Kokkaranthangal
 Kottaikkadu
 Kulattur
 Kuvathur
 Lathur
 Madavilagam
 Madayambakkam
 Makundagiri
 Malarajakuppam
 Mambakkam
 Manikkakuppam
 Maruderi
 Melmaruvathur
 Mudhaliyarkuppam
 Mugaiyur
 Murukkanthangal
 NainarKuppam
 Nedumaram
 Nelvoy
 Nelvoypalayam
 Nemandam
 Nerkunam
 Nerkurapattu
 Nilamangalam
 Ottivilagam
 Odhiyur
 Pachambakkam
 Pakkaranai
 Pakkur
 Pakkuvancheri
 Palur
 Panayadivakkam
 Paramankeni
 Parameswaramangalam
 Parasanallur
 Parukkai
 Pavanjur
 Perambakkam
 Periyakilakadi
 Periyavelikkadu
 Perukkaranai
 Periyakattupakkam
 Perumalcheri
 Perumbakkam
 Perunthuravu
 Poigainallur
 Polambakkam
 Pondur
 Ponkunran
 Poongunam
 Pooriampakkam
 Porur
 Puduppattu
 Puliyani
 Punnamai
 Pupupatti
 Puraiyur
 Puranjeri
 Puttirankottai
 Sattamangalam
 Satyamangalam
 Sembur
 Sengattur
 Sevur
 Sikkinamkuppam
 Sirukalathur
 Sirukalathur
 Sirumayilur
 Sirunagar
 Siruvalambakkam
 Siruvankundram
 Sittamur
 Sivadi
 Sothupakkam
 Tandalam
 Tandamanallur
 Tattampattu
 Thenpakkam
 Thandarai
 Thenpattinam
 Tiruppurakkovil
 Tiruvadur
 Tuduvakanbattu
 Uludamangalam
 Vadakkuvayalur
 Vadappatanam
 Vanniyanallur
 Vayalur
 Vedal
 Vellankondagaram
 Vembanur
 Venmelaguram
 Veppancheri
 Vettaikarankuppam
 Vettamperumbakkam
 Vilambattu
 Vilambur
 Villangadu
 Virabhogam
 Yaluvankaramai
Thondamanallur
Velur
manapakkam

Economic activity
MARG Swarnabhoomi-new chennai, an integrated township, with two special economic zones is located in the Cheyyur Taluk.

References

Taluks of Chengalpattu district